Anđelka Tomašević (Serbian Cyrillic: Aнђeлка Томашевић; born 6 July 1993) is a Serbian model and beauty pageant titleholder. She represented Serbia in Miss Earth 2013 pageant in Muntinlupa, Metro Manila, Philippines and also she represented her country at the Miss Universe 2014 pageant but Unplaced.

Early and personal life
Tomašević was born on 6 July 1993 in Zubin Potok, FR Yugoslavia. She has an elder sister, Milica, who was Miss Kosovo and Metohija 2011. Tomašević is studying Faculty of Hotel Management and Tourism in Belgrade. She currently resides in Belgrade. Tomašević won Miss internet award in Miss Serbia 2013 and become Miss Universe Serbia 2014. She is student of Faculty of Tourism in Belgrade. Her hobbies include sports, acting, dancing and reading. She also has modeling experience, participation in a few humanitarian fashion shows and Serbia Fashion Week.

Pageantry

Miss Earth 2013
As the official representative of her country to the 2013 Miss Earth pageant, Tomašević won Miss GLNG award and placed in the top 15 in preliminary swimsuit and resort wear competition. She placed in the top 8 in the Miss Earth 2013 final.

Miss Universe 2014
Tomašević represented Serbia at Miss Universe 2014. Although considered to be a strong candidate by many, she failed to place in the Top 15.

Notes

References

Kosovo Serbs
Serbian female models
Kosovan emigrants to Serbia
Serbian beauty pageant winners
Miss Earth 2013 contestants
1993 births
People from Zubin Potok
Miss Universe 2014 contestants
Living people